The Gordon Myers Amateur Achievement Award, known until 2018 as the Amateur Achievement Award of the  Astronomical Society of the Pacific, is one of nine annual astronomical awards managed by the Astronomical Society of the Pacific. It recognizes "significant contributions to astronomy or amateur astronomy by those not employed in the field of astronomy in a professional capacity." The contributions can be done in the fields of both observational astronomy or astronomical technologies. The award has been given to amateur astronomers from various countries since 1979 and has become one of the most geographically diverse astronomical awards.

Award winners receive a commemorative plaque, which is presented at the Annual Meeting Awards Banquet. The monetary value of the award is US$500. Candidates can be nominated by any member of the astronomical community (with the exception of the nominees themselves and their families) and the nominations should be accompanied by other letters of support. All the nominations have to be delivered to the Astronomical Society of the Pacific by December 15 of the nominating year and remain valid for three years. The winners are selected by the Awards Committee appointed by the Board of Directors. The committee have the right not to award any of the nominees if they do not consider their achievements exceptional enough, which has already happened several times.

Winners 

Recipients of the award have been:

See also
Other Astronomical Society of the Pacific awards:
 Catherine Wolfe Bruce Gold Medal
 Klumpke-Roberts Award
 Robert J. Trumpler Award
Other amateur astronomy awards:
 Chambliss Amateur Achievement Award
 List of astronomy awards

Notes

References
 
 

Astronomy prizes
Awards established in 1979